The Nature of Sap is Portastatic's third studio album. It was released on Merge Records on March 11, 1997.

Production
The album was recorded at Duck Kee Studios in Mebane, North Carolina, during the summer of 1996, except tracks 4, 7-9, and 11, which were recorded on 4-track cassette on "Old NC 86." Matt McCaughan plays drums on many of the album's tracks.

Critical reception
The Tucson Weekly wrote that "Portastatic seems to be what happens when an aging punk rocker and his ambitious musical vision 'mature': passivity, depression and terminal boredom." Phoenix New Times called the album "a multilayered opus of pop precocity." Paste deemed it the band's most underrated album, calling it "a downcast jazzy pop record that dabbles with electronic minimalism and features some of [Mac] McCaughan’s best song writing." SF Weekly wrote that The Nature of Sap "finds the normally manic Superchunk frontman in an extended soporific spelunk through the caves of his waking dreams."

Track listing 
 "You Know Where to Find Me"
 "A Lovely Nile"
 "Hurricane Warning (Ignored)"
 "Reverse Lester"
 "Flare"
 "Jonathan's Organ"
 "Before You Sailed Around the World"
 "Ben's Revenge"
 "Impolite Cheers"
 "Spying on the Spys"
 "BJJT"
 "Landed"
 "If You Could Sing"
 "The Nature of Sap"
 "[Silent Hidden Track]"
 "[Untitled Hidden Track]"

References

1997 albums
Portastatic albums
Merge Records albums